Nikolai Nikolayevich Bochko (born 1 March 1999) is a Russian football player.

Club career
He made his debut in the Russian Professional Football League for FC Krasnodar-2 on 15 May 2018 in a game against FC Afips Afipsky. He made his Russian Football National League debut for Krasnodar-2 on 4 August 2018 in a game against FC Tyumen.

References

External links
 
 

1999 births
People from Tuapse
Living people
Russian footballers
Russia youth international footballers
Association football defenders
FC SKA Rostov-on-Don players
Russian First League players
Russian Second League players
FC Krasnodar-2 players
Sportspeople from Krasnodar Krai